The Meyer Baronetcy, of Shortgrove in the parish of Newport in the County of Essex, is a title in the Baronetage of the United Kingdom. It was created on 18 July 1910 for Carl Meyer, former governor of the National Bank of Egypt. The second and third Baronets were both Conservative politicians.

Meyer baronets, of Shortgrove (1910)
Sir Carl Ferdinand Meyer, 1st Baronet (1851–1922)
Sir Frank Cecil Meyer, 2nd Baronet (1886–1935)
Sir Anthony John Charles Meyer, 3rd Baronet (1920–2004)
Sir Anthony Ashley Frank Meyer, 4th Baronet (born 1944)

Notes

References
Kidd, Charles, Williamson, David (editors). Debrett's Peerage and Baronetage (1990 edition). New York: St Martin's Press, 1990, 

Meyer